Fatality may refer to:
 Fatality (Mortal Kombat), a finishing move, originated in the Mortal Kombat series of fighting games
 Fatality (comics), a character published by DC Comics
 Fatal1ty, the screen name of professional electronic sports player, Johnathan Wendel

See also
 Casualty (person)
 Fatal (disambiguation)
 Lethality, a term designating the ability of a weapon to kill
 Mortality (disambiguation)
 :Category:Death-related lists -- lists of fatalities